John Gurkin  (born 9 September 1895 – 25 February 1976) was an English footballer who played as a centre half or left half in the Football League for West Ham United, Norwich City, Durham City and Exeter City.

Club career
Signed by West Ham from South Hetton Rovers, Gurkin played only once, on 27 August 1921 in a 2–0 home defeat by Stoke. Moving to Norwich City in 1922 he remained for only one season before moving into non-league football with Stalybridge Celtic and Spennymoor United. He returned to the Football League with Durham City, making 160 appearances over four seasons in the Third Division North. After a season with Stalybridge Celtic, Gurkin finished his league career with two appearances for Exeter City, after which he returned to non-league with Hyde United, Jarrow and Murton Colliery Welfare.

References

1895 births
1976 deaths
People from Murton, County Durham
Footballers from County Durham
English footballers
Association football defenders
West Ham United F.C. players
Norwich City F.C. players
Stalybridge Celtic F.C. players
Spennymoor United F.C. players
Durham City A.F.C. players
Exeter City F.C. players
Hyde United F.C. players
Jarrow F.C. players
Murton A.F.C. players
English Football League players